The 1978 Polish Speedway season was the 1978 season of motorcycle speedway in Poland.

Individual

Polish Individual Speedway Championship
The 1978 Individual Speedway Polish Championship final was held on 22 July at Gorzów.

Golden Helmet
The 1978 Golden Golden Helmet organised by the Polish Motor Union (PZM) was the 1978 event for the league's leading riders.

Final

Junior Championship
 winner - Wiesław Patynek

Silver Helmet
 winner - Andrzej Huszcza

Bronze Helmet
 winner - Mieczysław Kmieciak

Pairs

Polish Pairs Speedway Championship
The 1978 Polish Pairs Speedway Championship was the 1978 edition of the Polish Pairs Speedway Championship. The final was held on 21 June at Chorzów.

Team

Team Speedway Polish Championship
The 1978 Team Speedway Polish Championship was the 1978 edition of the Team Polish Championship. 

Stal Gorzów Wielkopolski won the gold medal for the fourth successive year. The team included Edward Jancarz, Bolesław Proch, Bogusław Nowak and Jerzy Rembas.

First League

Second League

References

Poland Individual
Poland Team
Speedway
1978 in Polish speedway